The Beautiful Trip (French: Le beau voyage) is a 1947 French drama film directed by Louis Cuny and starring Renée Saint-Cyr, Pierre Richard-Willm and André Valmy.

The film's sets were designed by the art director Lucien Carré.

Cast
 Renée Saint-Cyr as Lena  
 Pierre Richard-Willm as Richard Lehmann  
 André Valmy as Yvon
 Pierre Bertin as Le passager au monocle  
 Jean Wall as Wallace  
 Laure Diana as Une passagère  
 René Génin as Le patron du magasin de lingerie  
 Marcel Carpentier as Le banquier  
 Jane Marken as La femme d'Albert  
 Paul Ollivier as Albert  
 Marcel Pérès as Le patron du 'Café du port'  
 Luce Clament 
 Ginette Baudin as La femme du banquier  
 Marius David 
 René Pascal 
 Paul Delauzac as Le commandant Bernard 
 Odette Barencey as La vieille femme au restaurant  
 Edmond Beauchamp as Le marin solitaire sur la plage  
 Bernard Charlan as Le bibliothécaire  
 Robert Demorget as Le fils du patron du 'Café du port'  
 Lucien Hector as Le patron du 'Peter's bar'  
 Daniel Ivernel as Yvon  
 Jacques Marin as Un voyou 
 Franck Maurice as Un gardien de prison

References

Bibliography 
 Dayna Oscherwitz & MaryEllen Higgins. The A to Z of French Cinema. Scarecrow Press, 2009.

External links 
 

1947 films
French drama films
1947 drama films
1940s French-language films
Films directed by Louis Cuny
Gaumont Film Company films
French black-and-white films
1940s French films